Zomorodi is an Iranian surname. Notable people with the surname include:

Manoush Zomorodi, American journalist, podcast host, and author
Negin Zomorodi (born 1973), Iranian composer and pianist

Iranian-language surnames